James Dell Talarico (born May 17, 1989) is an American politician and former teacher. He was elected to the Texas House of Representatives in 2018 to represent District 52, which includes the cities of Round Rock, Taylor, Hutto, and Georgetown in Williamson County. Following the 2020 redistricting cycle, Talarico announced his run for a seat in District 50 in 2022. He is a member of the Democratic Party.

Talarico currently serves on the Texas House of Representatives' Public Education Committee, Calendars Committee, and Juvenile Justice and Family Issues Committee.

Early life and education 

Talarico was born at Round Rock Hospital in Williamson County, Texas, to Tamara Causey and was later adopted by Mark Talarico. He has a younger sister. He attended Round Rock ISD schools and graduated from McNeil High School in Williamson County.

Talarico earned a Bachelor of Arts degree in government from the University of Texas at Austin, where he organized students for tuition relief. Talarico was a member of the Friar Society, the University of Texas's oldest honor society. He later earned a Master of Arts degree in education policy from Harvard University.

Career 
In 2011, Talarico joined Teach For America, teaching sixth grade English language arts at Rhodes Middle School on the west side of San Antonio. After leaving the classroom, Talarico was the central Texas executive director for Reasoning Mind, a Texas nonprofit focusing on bringing technology to low-income classrooms.

Texas House of Representatives

2018
Talarico launched his campaign for the Texas House shortly after incumbent state legislator Larry Gonzales announced his retirement. At 28, Talarico won both the special and general elections against Republican Cynthia Flores in 2018, garnering media attention for walking the full length of the district.

Talarico was sworn into the Texas House of Representatives on November 20, 2018. He was appointed to the Public Education and Juvenile Justice Committees, and currently serves as the youngest member of the Texas Legislature.

In the 86th Texas Legislature, he filed the Whole Student Agenda, a legislative package with bills addressing public education policy. As a member of the Public Education Committee, he helped draft House Bill 3, which contained $11.6 billion in funds for school finance and property tax reform.

During Talarico's first term, a recording of Texas House Speaker Dennis Bonnen was leaked by Michael Quinn Sullivan of the conservative advocacy group Empower Texans. In it, Bonnen claimed he had recruited a challenger for "that Talarico kid."

2020
Talarico won reelection against former Hutto City Councilmember Lucio Valdez with 51.5% of the vote. For the 87th Legislative Session, he was reappointed to the Public Education and Juvenile Justice Committees and appointed to the Calendars committee.

During the 87th legislative session, he filed Javier Ambler's Law, demanding an end to police contracts with reality TV shows, in response to the role Live PD is alleged to have played in the killing of Javier Ambler by Williamson County police. He had previously criticized Sheriff Robert Chody's handling of the incident, calling for his resignation.

2022
After being drawn into a Republican district during the 2020 redistricting process, Talarico announced that he would run in the neighboring House District 50, a Democratic seat being vacated by Rep. Celia Israel.

Election history

2018

2020

2022

References

External links 
 James Talarico –  Texas House website
 James Talarico – Campaign website

1989 births
Living people
21st-century American politicians
People from Round Rock, Texas
University of Texas at Austin alumni
Harvard Graduate School of Education alumni
Democratic Party members of the Texas House of Representatives
Teach For America alumni